Khuda Bakhsh (or Bux) Sheikh was an Urdu writer and poet from the Barabanki district of Uttar Pradesh, India. He published poetry in Arabic, Urdu and Persian.

He followed a Sufi master, Waris Ali Shah, and wrote a book Tohmat-ul-Asfiya about him.  In 1877 he published Shah's sayings as a book entitled Malfuzat-i-Haji Waris 'Ali Shah.

See also 
 Waris Ali Shah
 Bedam Shah Warsi

References 

Indian male poets
Poets from Uttar Pradesh